Aoibhinn Grimes (born August 30, 1976, in Kelowna, British Columbia) is a former field hockey forward from Canada, who earned a total number of hundred international caps for the Canadian Women's National Team during her career. On national level she played for University of Victoria Vikes. Grimes earned a degree in kinesiology from the University of Victoria.

International Senior Tournaments
 1997 – World Cup Qualifier, Harare, Zimbabwe (11th)
 1998 – Commonwealth Games, Kuala Lumpur, Malaysia (not ranked)
 1999 – Pan American Games, Winnipeg, Canada (3rd)
 2001 – Pan American Cup, Kingston, Jamaica (3rd)
 2001 – World Cup Qualifier, Amiens/Abbeville, France (10th)
 2002 – Commonwealth Games, Manchester, England (7th)

External links
 Profile on Field Hockey Canada

1976 births
Canadian female field hockey players
Field hockey players at the 1998 Commonwealth Games
Field hockey players at the 2002 Commonwealth Games
Living people
Sportspeople from Kelowna
Commonwealth Games competitors for Canada
20th-century Canadian women
21st-century Canadian women